Sis is a village and municipality in the Shamakhi Rayon of Azerbaijan.  It has a population of 346.

References 

Populated places in Shamakhi District